Lázaro Maikel Ruiz (born October 12, 1984) is a Cuban weightlifter.

At the 2008 Pan American Weightlifting Championships he won bronze in the 62 kg category, lifting a total of 284 kg.

He competed in Weightlifting at the 2008 Summer Olympics in the 62 kg division finishing sixth, with 294 kg, beating his previous personal best by 10 kg.

Ruiz won the – 62 gold medal in snatch and silver clean & jerk during the 2014 Pan American Sports Festival.

Notes and references

External links
 Athlete Biography at beijing2008

Cuban male weightlifters
1984 births
Living people
Weightlifters at the 2008 Summer Olympics
Olympic weightlifters of Cuba
Pan American Weightlifting Championships medalists
20th-century Cuban people
21st-century Cuban people